Shambhuraj Shivajirao Desai is an Indian politician and Shiv Sena leader from Satara district, Maharashtra. He is a member of the 14th Maharashtra Legislative Assembly. He represents the Patan Assembly Constituency. He had been elected to Vidhan Sabha for three terms in 2004, 2014 and 2019.

Positions held
 1986-96: Chairman of Loknete Balasaheb Desai Sahakari Sakhar Karkhana Ltd.
 1992-2002: Member of Zilla Parishad Satara 
 1997-99: Chairman of Maharashtra Cooperation Council (Minister of State status) 
 2004: Elected to Maharashtra Legislative Assembly
 2014: Re-elected to Maharashtra Legislative Assembly
 2019: Re-elected to Maharashtra Legislative Assembly
 2019: Appointed minister of state for Home (Rural), Finance and Planning, State Excise, Marketing, Skill Development and Entrepreneurship
 2020: Appointed guardian minister of Washim district

See also
 Uddhav Thackeray ministry

References

External links
 Official website
  Shivsena Home Page 

Living people
Maharashtra MLAs 2004–2009
Maharashtra MLAs 2014–2019
Shiv Sena politicians
People from Satara district
Maharashtra district councillors
Marathi politicians
1966 births
Maharashtra MLAs 2019–2024